Parapsectra is a genus of European non-biting midges in the subfamily Chironominae of the bloodworm family Chironomidae.

Species
P. chionophila (Edwards, 1933)
P. nana (Meigen, 1818)

Chironomidae
Diptera of Europe